Jinghu District is a district of the city of Wuhu, Anhui Province, China.

Administrative divisions
Jinghu District is divided to 11 subdistricts and 1 town.
11 Subdistricts

1 Town
 Fangcun

References

External links

Wuhu